is a Japanese politician of the Democratic Party of Japan, a member of the House of Councillors in the Diet (national legislature). A native of Hirosaki, Aomori and graduate of Akita Junior College (now Akita Eiyo Junior College), she was elected to the House of Councillors for the first time in 2004 after serving in the city assembly of Hirosaki for three terms.

References

External links 
 Official website in Japanese.

Members of the House of Councillors (Japan)
Female members of the House of Councillors (Japan)
Japanese municipal councilors
Politicians from Aomori Prefecture
People from Hirosaki
Living people
1940 births
Democratic Party of Japan politicians